Americo Zorilla "Rico" Alaniz (October 25, 1919 – March 9, 2015) was a Mexican-American actor.

Early years
Alaniz was born in Juárez, Mexico, and began riding when he was a child.

Selected filmography

 The Capture (1950) - Policeman (uncredited)
 A Lady Without Passport (1950) - Young Cuban Man (uncredited)
 Mister 880 (1950) - Carlos - Spanish Interpreter (uncredited)
 Smuggler's Island (1951) - Young Portuguese (uncredited)
 Hollywood Story (1951) - Spanish Actor (uncredited)
 Golden Girl (1951) - Bandit (uncredited)
 The Fighter (1952) - Carlos
 Viva Zapata! (1952) - Guard (uncredited)
 Macao (1952) - Bus Driver (uncredited)
 California Conquest (1952) - Pedro
 Tropic Zone (1953) - Capt. Basilio (uncredited)
 Jeopardy (1953) - Officer at 1st Roadblock (uncredited)
 Column South (1953) - Trooper Chavez
 The Desert Song (1953) - Legionnaire (uncredited)
 Wings of the Hawk (1953) - Capt. Gomez
 Conquest of Cochise (1953) - Felipe
 Appointment in Honduras (1953) - Bermudez
 Jubilee Trail (1954) - Spaniard (uncredited)
 Phantom of the Rue Morgue (1954) - Gendarme (uncredited)
 Siege at Red River (1954) - Chief Yellow Hawk
 Drum Beat (1954) - Medicine Man (uncredited)
 Green Fire (1954) - Antonio
 The Last Command (1955) - Tomas (uncredited)
 Santiago (1956) - Dominguez (uncredited)
 Back from Eternity (1956) - Latin Official (uncredited)
 The Cruel Tower (1956) - Frenchy (uncredited)
 The Women of Pitcairn Island (1956) - The Spanisher
 Stagecoach to Fury (1956) - Miguel Torres
 Toughest Gun in Tombstone (1958) - Fernandez (uncredited)
 War of the Colossal Beast (1958) - Sgt. Luis Murillo
 Hong Kong Confidential (1958) - Fernando
 Wolf Larsen (1958) - Louis
 Sea Hunt (1960, Season 3, Episode 13) - Carlos Prado
 The Magnificent Seven (1960) - Sotero
 Summer and Smoke (1961) - Knife Thrower (uncredited)
 The Virginian (1963 episode "The Mountain of the Sun" - Bandido Leader
 Hotel (1967) - Chairman (uncredited)
 Final Analysis (1992) - Old Spanish Man (final film role)

References

External links 

 

 SAG-AFTRA In memoriam
 Rico Alaniz obituary is in this book and can be read in its excerpt. It's in alphabetical order.

1919 births
2015 deaths
American male film actors
American male television actors
American male actors of Mexican descent
20th-century American male actors
Male actors from Los Angeles
People from Ciudad Juárez
Male actors from Chihuahua (state)
Mexican emigrants to the United States
Mexican expatriate actors in the United States
Male Western (genre) film actors
Western (genre) television actors